Issam Harris (born 22 May 1993), known by his stage name Issam, is a Moroccan rapper, songwriter and trap artist. He was born in Derb Sultan, Casablanca and became known in 2018 with his song and music video, "Trap Beldi". This track allowed him to gain popularity being one of the first Moroccan trap songs to reach over 10 million views on YouTube.

What is particular of Issam's music is the blending of autotuned vocals delivered in Darija, and classic TR 808-generated beats with elements from traditional North African music. Many of Issam's works are influenced by raï—specifically by Cheb Hasni.

In May 2019, Issam signed a contract with Universal Music France, in what was considered the biggest ever deal for North African hip-hop. His debut album "Crystal" has officially been released on May 6 2021.

Discography

Singles 
 2016: "Taba Taba" 
2017: "Rolex" 
 2017: "Hasni"
 2018: "Bavra"
 2018: "Caviar" 
The “Caviar” video was originally planned to be partially shot in Paris, but Issam's visa application was denied by the French government. The track and its video showcase an increasingly globalized scene in which Arab artists nonetheless remain peripheral participants, due in part to the significant political difficulties in bypassing borders and enjoying the freedom of movement granted to Western performers.
 2018: "Trap Beldi" 
 2019: "Makinch Zhar"
 2020: "Nike"
 2020: "Power Rangers"
Which marks the artist's first collaboration with the Casablanca-based drill rapper, Dollypran.
 2021: "Wra Tabi3a"
 2021: "Hendrix"
 2022: "Phantom"
 2022: "YA HASRA"

Albums

 "Crystal" (Released May 2021)

References

Living people
1993 births
Moroccan rappers